WZBA (100.7 FM, "100.7 The Bay") is a commercial FM radio station licensed to serve Westminster, Maryland. The station is owned by Times-Shamrock Communications and broadcasts a classic rock format.

The station's service contour covers the Baltimore metropolitan area and southern portions of South Central Pennsylvania. The station markets itself as the only station in the Baltimore market dedicated to the classic rock format.

History
Engineer Russ Morgan signed on the station for the first time on November 1, 1959 as WTTR-FM.

Shamrock Communications purchased the station on April 7, 1981 and changed the format to easy listening. The station's call sign was changed to WGRX in 1984, with a format change to "Eclectic Oriented Rock", a hybrid format created by Radio Consultant John Sebastian. The format changed to classic rock in May 1987.

WGRX changed its format to modern rock on December 2, 1994, branded as The X. In April 1996, the station fired its program director and six DJs, then aired a weekend-long stunt of disco music as "Polyester 101" before switching to a country music format on May 6, 1996, branded as "Froggy 100.7". The station later rebranded as "New Country 100.7".

On December 1, 1999, due to declining ratings, the station switched its call sign to WZBA, rebranded as 100.7 The Bay and changed formats to "Rock AC" (Rock Adult Contemporary), similar to WMMO in Orlando with the slogan "Rock Without the Hard Edge".

In 2001, WZBA relocated its transmitter closer to Baltimore.

The station changed its format to classic rock when WXFB changed formats from classic rock to smooth jazz on September 5, 2003.

Jefferson Ward, the station's general manager, retired in 2021.

Signal note
WZBA is short-spaced to two other Class B stations operating on 100.7 MHz: WLEV 100.7 WLEV (licensed to serve Allentown, Pennsylvania) and WZXL 100.7 ZXL (licensed to serve Wildwood, New Jersey). The distance between WZBA's transmitter and WLEV's transmitter is only , while the distance between WZBA's transmitter and WZXL's transmitter is only , as determined by FCC rules. The minimum distance between two Class B stations operating on the same channel according to current FCC rules is 150 miles.

Translators
WZBA programming is broadcast on the following translator:

References

External links

ZBA
Classic rock radio stations in the United States
Radio stations established in 1959
1959 establishments in Maryland